The Witney by-election was a UK parliamentary by-election held on 20 October 2016 in the constituency of Witney in Oxfordshire. It took place on the same day as the Batley and Spen by-election. They were the fifth and sixth by-elections of the 56th UK Parliament.

The by-election was triggered by the resignation of the sitting Conservative Member of Parliament (MP) David Cameron, the former Prime Minister of the United Kingdom on 12 September 2016. The election was won by the Conservative Robert Courts with a reduced vote share, and the Liberal Democrats came in second with an increase in vote share of 23.4 percentage points.

Background
David Cameron had been the Conservative Party MP for the seat since the 2001 general election, becoming leader of the Conservative Party in 2005 and Prime Minister of the United Kingdom in 2010. Following the Leave result in the referendum on the United Kingdom's membership of the European Union that Cameron had campaigned against, he resigned as Prime Minister and leader of the Conservative Party, being replaced by Theresa May. In September 2016 he announced his resignation as an MP saying he did not want to be a distraction to May's premiership.

Candidates
The Conservatives picked Robert Courts, a barrister and West Oxfordshire District Councillor since 2014, from a shortlist of three candidates; he defeated Natasha Whitmill, a former aide to Cameron, and John Cotton, the leader of South Oxfordshire District Council. Though Witney voted in favour of remain in the EU referendum on 23 June 2016, Courts is a "Brexiter", which means that he supports Brexit.

The Labour Party selected Duncan Enright as their candidate. He serves as a West Oxfordshire District Councillor and stood in Witney at the 2015 general election, finishing second behind Cameron.

The Liberal Democrats selected Liz Leffman, a West Oxfordshire District Councillor (for Charlbury and Finstock) and local businesswoman, as the party's candidate. She stood in Witney in the 2005 general election, finishing second to Cameron.

The UK Independence Party named Kenrick "Dickie" Bird. He served in the army in Oxfordshire's local Regiment, The Royal Green Jackets, before becoming Head Porter at Oriel College, Oxford, and stood in Banbury in 2015, coming third.

The Green Party named Larry Sanders, a former Oxfordshire County Councillor and brother of US Senator Bernie Sanders. He came fifth in the 2015 general election in the neighbouring constituency of Oxford West and Abingdon.

The National Health Action Party (NHA) selected Dr Helen Salisbury, a GP and lecturer at Oxford University Medical School. Salisbury was their candidate in Oxford West & Abingdon at the 2015 general election.

Winston McKenzie, a former professional boxer and a perennial candidate, was named as the candidate of the English Democrats. He came third in Croydon North at the previous general election.

Independent candidate Adam Knight endorsed the Liberal Democrat candidate, Leffman, during the campaign.

Overall, fourteen candidates stood in the by-election.

Result

The Liberal Democrats recorded their highest share of the vote in Witney since 1983.

Previous results in constituency

2015 election results

2016 EU referendum result
The constituency is co-terminous with the district of West Oxfordshire which, in the EU referendum on 23 June 2016, voted in favour of remain.

See also
 List of United Kingdom by-elections (2010–present)
 2007 Sedgefield by-election

References

Witney by-election
Witney by-election
By-elections to the Parliament of the United Kingdom in Oxfordshire constituencies
David Cameron
Witney by-election
Witney by-election
2010s in Oxfordshire